Pseudoselago is a genus of flowering plants belonging to the family Scrophulariaceae.

Its native range is South African Republic.

Species:

Pseudoselago arguta 
Pseudoselago ascendens 
Pseudoselago bella 
Pseudoselago burmanni 
Pseudoselago caerulescens 
Pseudoselago candida 
Pseudoselago densifolia 
Pseudoselago diplotricha 
Pseudoselago gracilis 
Pseudoselago guttata 
Pseudoselago hilliardiae 
Pseudoselago humilis 
Pseudoselago langebergensis 
Pseudoselago outeniquensis 
Pseudoselago parvifolia 
Pseudoselago peninsulae 
Pseudoselago prolixa 
Pseudoselago prostrata 
Pseudoselago pulchra 
Pseudoselago quadrangularis 
Pseudoselago rapunculoides 
Pseudoselago recurvifolia 
Pseudoselago serrata 
Pseudoselago similis 
Pseudoselago spuria 
Pseudoselago subglabra 
Pseudoselago verbenacea 
Pseudoselago violacea

References

Scrophulariaceae
Scrophulariaceae genera